Podova is a settlement in the Municipality of Rače–Fram in northeastern Slovenia. It lies on the flatlands on the right bank of the Drava River southeast of Rače. The area is part of the traditional region of Styria. The municipality is now included in the Drava Statistical Region.

A small chapel in the village square dates to the late 18th century.

References

External links
Podova at Geopedia

Populated places in the Municipality of Rače-Fram